Ma Yize (traditional: 馬依澤, simplified: 马依泽, c. 910 – 1005) was a Muslim Hui Chinese
astronomer and astronomer of Arab origin who worked as the chief official of the astronomical observatory  for the Song dynasty. According to Chinese sources, his origin lies in an area in Northeast Yemen, 60 kilometers South of Mecca and belonged to a family which descended from a certain companion of the Islamic prophet Muhammad.

Career and works 
In the early 10th century, the Chinese emperor of the Song dynasty encouraged the advancement of the study of astronomy and its related disciplines. In 961, the Emperor Taizu (r. 960-976) appointed Ma Yize (910?-1005) as the chief official to take charge of the government observatory.

Ma Yize assisted Wang Chuna in compiling several important astrological works, including the Yingtianli (Calendar of Corresponding Heavens). His job was to provide observation, and computation of the regularities in celestial phenomena, using the Islamic methods. His findings were used by Wang Chuna in the compilation of Yingtianli, which was completed in 963. The calculation, based on a 7-day week system similar to that in the Islamic calendar, was first adopted in this document, which was the most important occurrence in the Chinese history of calendrical methods.

Ma Yize might have consulted many works of Islamic mathematical astronomy into Chinese, including:
 Kitab al-Zij [Al-Battani sive Albatenni Opus astronomicum], 880, by Abu'Abdallah al-Battani [Latin: Albategni or Albatenius], 858-929
 al-Zij al-sabi [The Sabian Tables]
 Kitab Matali' al-Buruj [On the Ascensions of the Signs of the Zodiac]
 Kitab Aqdar al- Ittisalat [On the Quantities of the Astrological Applications]

It is possible that Ma was influenced by Al-Battani and Al-Hamdani. Owing to Ma's contribution to the compilation of 'Yingtianli', Ma was made a hereditary noble and his sons later succeeded his position with the Imperial Observatory.

References

External links
 Al-Battani, (858?-929) and Ma Yize (910?-1005)
 The Song Dynasty

11th-century Chinese astronomers
Hui people
Song dynasty politicians
10th-century astrologers
11th-century astrologers
10th-century Chinese astronomers
Chinese people of Arab descent